The 2008–09 Cal State Northridge Matadors men's basketball team represented California State University, Northridge in the 2008–09 NCAA Division I men's basketball season. The Matadors, led by head coach Bobby Braswell, played their home games at the Matadome in Northridge, California as members of the Big West Conference.

Roster 

Source

Schedule and results 

|-
!colspan=12 style=| Regular season

|-
!colspan=12 style=| Big West tournament

|-
!colspan=12 style=| NCAA tournament

|-

Source

References

Cal State Northridge Matadors men's basketball seasons
Cal State Northridge Matadors
Cal State Northridge
Cal State Northridge Matadors men's basketball
Cal State Northridge Matadors men's basketball